Miles Dominic Heizer (born May 16, 1994) is an American actor. On television, he is known for portraying Alex Standall in the Netflix original series 13 Reasons Why and Drew Holt in the NBC drama series Parenthood. He has also appeared in the films Rails & Ties (2007), The Stanford Prison Experiment (2015), Nerve (2016), and Love, Simon (2018).

Early life 
Heizer's mother is a nurse, and he has an older sister. As a child, Heizer performed in a number of community theater productions in Lexington, Kentucky. His family moved to Los Angeles to support his acting career full time when he was ten years old.

Career 
Heizer starred in the short film Paramedic as Young James. Heizer has since guest-starred in episodes of Ghost Whisperer, Shark, Bones, and Private Practice.

In 2007, Heizer played the role of Davey Danner at 12 years old in the film Rails & Ties, for which he was nominated for the Young Artist Award for Best Leading Young Actor in a Feature Film. That same year, he had a recurring role as Joshua Lipnicki on the NBC medical drama television series ER. In 2010, he was cast as Drew Holt, the son of Lauren Graham's character, on the NBC drama series Parenthood. Heizer portrayed Drew until the series' ending in 2015.

In 2013, Heizer co-starred as Josh in the film Rudderless. In 2015, he had a supporting role as Marshall Lovett in the drama-thriller film The Stanford Prison Experiment, which premiered at the Sundance Film Festival on January 26. In 2016, Heizer starred as Tommy Mancuso in the film Nerve, and from 2017 to 2020, he played Alex Standall in the Netflix original series 13 Reasons Why. He also played Cal Price, one of Simon's classmates, in the 2018 movie Love, Simon.

In 2018, Heizer was featured in clothing retailer Gap's Logo Remix campaign. Heizer was also featured in Coach's fall and winter 2019 fashion campaigns.

Personal life 
At the age of 19, Heizer came out as part of the LGBT community.

Filmography

Film

Television

Awards and nominations

References

External links 

 
 
 

1994 births
Living people
21st-century American male actors
American male television actors
American male film actors
American male child actors
Male actors from Kentucky
People from Greenville, Kentucky
LGBT people from Kentucky
American LGBT actors
LGBT male actors